Josephine Barnard (born 28 December 1978) is a South African former cricketer who played as a right-handed batter and right-arm off break bowler. She appeared in three Test matches and eight One Day Internationals for South Africa between 2002 and 2004. She played domestic cricket for Boland.

References

External links
 
 

1978 births
Living people
People from George, South Africa
South African women cricketers
South Africa women Test cricketers
South Africa women One Day International cricketers
Boland women cricketers
Cricketers from the Western Cape